Slovenian Internet Exchange (SIX) is a Slovenian internet exchange point.

As of April 2014, the SIX interconnects 26 Internet service providers on two locations in Ljubljana, one being in Jožef Stefan Institute and secondary in Ljubljana Technology Park. They are managed by Academic and Research Network of Slovenia. SIX's average yearly traffic is 21 Gbit/s reaching peaks of 55 Gbit/s making it the most significant exchange point in Slovenia.

See also 
 List of Internet exchange points by size

References

External links 
 Slovenian Internet Exchange website

Internet in Slovenia
Internet exchange points in Europe